Hygromycin A (also known as totomycin) is a modified cinnamic acid flanked by a furanose sugar and aminocyclitol (not to be confused with hygromycin B, belonging to an unrelated class of antibiotics, aminoglycosides). It is produced by Streptomyces hygroscopicus, first described in the 1950s.

History
Hygromycin A was discovered in a soil sample from a forest near Indianapolis, Indiana in 1953 by Waksman and Henrici. Identification and structure of totomycin was not determined until 1957.

Little further research was performed on totomycin for decades afterwards due to its weak activity against most bacteria, and as of 2021 its safety or efficacy in humans have not been assessed in any preclinical or clinical trials, although some initial results in mice were promising.

Antibiotic activity
It was thought that the strongest antibiotic activity of totomycin was against Staphylococcus haemolyticus, in which growth was inhibited by concentrations of 2 µg/mL. Other gram-positive and gram-negative sensitive to totomycin are inhibited by concentrations from 16 to 31 µg/mL.

In 2021 it was reported that Hygromycin A is very effective against spirochetes and can be used to eliminate the spirochete that causes Lyme disease. Bait laced with hygromycin A could be used to eliminate Lyme disease in the wild.

Total synthesis
Totomycin has been a successful target in total synthesis since 1989.

References

Aminoglycoside antibiotics